Piotr Tyszkiewicz (born 4 September 1970) is a Polish former professional footballer who played as a forward.

Post-playing career
Tyszkiewicz owned a football school.

External links
 
 "Znani nie tylko w Olsztynie": Piotr Tyszkiewicz*

References

Living people
1970 births
Polish footballers
Association football forwards
People from Ostróda
Ekstraklasa players
Bundesliga players
2. Bundesliga players
Zagłębie Lubin players
Olimpia Poznań players
VfL Wolfsburg players
Eintracht Braunschweig players
OKS Stomil Olsztyn players
Polish expatriate footballers
Polish expatriate sportspeople in Germany
Expatriate footballers in Germany